The Tuen Mun - Chek Lap Kok TBM is the world's largest tunnel boring machine launched in June 2015 by Herrenknecht in Germany. The TBM is used to drill a 5 km tunnel connecting Tuen Mun to the Hong Kong International Airport, part of the Tuen Mun–Chek Lap Kok Link project. The machine has a diameter of 17.6 m, 0.2 m more than Bertha, the previous largest tunnel boring machine.

Operations

The machine will excavate a 5 km-long underwater tunnel, working at pressures as high as 5 bars. The drilling will take place in depths of up to 50 m below sea level.

References

External links
Tunneltalk website

Heavy equipment
Tunnel boring machines